Mandisa Monakali is a public speaker, educator, social worker, researcher, lobbyist, advocate, project manager, strategic planner, workshop and community organizer. She is the founder and Executive Director of  Ilitha Labantu.

Ilitha is a South Africa social service and educational organization, a Nonprofit organization/Non-governmental organization (NGO). It is an organization that works and provides services for disadvantaged Gugulethu, Township (South Africa) communities throughout the Western Cape Town. Mandisa participates globally in conferences and events representing Ilitha and South Africa. Ilitha Labantu was founded in 1989. It was registered as a Not for Profit in South Africa with the Department of Social Development in 2003. It is an organization that promotes peace and development with a focus on economic empowerment, and to eradicate violence against women.

Ilitha focuses on community mobilization, outreach, and program initiatives for women to participate in programs that are economically and socially beneficial.
An NGO operating in disadvantaged Township (South Africa) communities throughout the Western Cape. The organization was created to deal with violence against women and children which was seen as an obstacle to development in the township communities.

Mandisa is acknowledged for her work for violence against women and children, human rights, equality, rural development,
HIV/AIDS, Millennium Development Goals, Sustainable Development Goals, and her participation in world conferences and women issues; World Conference on Women, 1995 that was held in Beijing, China. Ilitha's main focus is the UN Sustainable Development Goal 5: Which is to achieve gender equality and empower all women and girls. She is a survivor of violence against women.

Early life

Mandisa Monakali was born in Cape Town, South Africa. She has been politically active for women rights since the age of 16. During apartheid she started a program to educate women. She started the organization to educate women out of her home. She was arrested and spent 18 months in jail.  Upon her release she lived underground for a year until it was safe. Mandisa Monakali was born in Cape Town, South Africa.

She attended ID Mkize High School, Cape Town, South Africa in 1979.
In 1980 attended University of Western Cape - Cape Town, South Africa and studied Pre School Education.
In 1983 received a Bachelor of Arts - Humanities from University Of Western Cape.

Career
Mandisa Monakali has spent most of her adult life in human and community development, with a focus on gender development and leadership training for women and youth.

Mandisa Monakali and Litha Musyimi-Ogana the Regional Director of The African Center for Empowerment in Kenya organized the Women's Peace Train during the 2002 World Summit on Sustainable Development (WSSD), August 27-September 4, 2002.  The Women's Peace Train journeyed from Rwanda to South Africa. Women from several African countries escorted the Peace Train to advocate for and demand an end to wars and conflict in their countries. The Peace Train's goal as stated in the invitations they sent out; "To pass on a strong message to the continent′s leaders, war mongers, armies, guerrillas, arms traders and dealers in the African continent that women want peace and stability for their children and future generations and call upon ring leaders and perpetrators of these wars to end them forthwith."
The message to the WSSD was that there can be do sustainable development without addressing peace. The Africa Women's Peace Train was launched in Kampala, Uganda on August 15 with a ceremony where a Peace Torch was received. The Peace Train traveled through  Kenya, Tanzania, Malawi, Zambia, Mozambique, Botswana and ending in Johannesburg,  South Africa for the World Summit on Sustainable Development (WSSD) on 25 August 2002.
  She is a member of Women's Environment and Development Organization (WEDO), and organized the Women's Action Tent at the World's Summit on Sustainable Development.

Ilitha Labantu sponsors yearly events during the Women's March (South Africa) commemoration activities. Which takes place on August 9 of each year to commemorate the Women's March that took place on 9 August 1956 in Pretoria, South Africa. Where the women marchers'protested the introduction of the Apartheid pass laws for black women in 1952. Each events are organized to educate and encourage young women of Gugulethu to their history.

Mandisa participates yearly at the United Nations Conference on the Status of Women representing South Africa at this global conference that is held every year. The 2015 Conference on The Status of Women's CSW59 marked the anniversary of the Beijing Conference. The Beijing conference which was held in 1995. She stated at the CSW59; “For us Beijing +20 was not about UN, it was about our daily lives as South African women and you could see what was happening now in the country. The number of women we have in construction for instance has increased,” Mandisa Monakali.
She has participated in the 2005 and 2015 Beijing Conferences. The 1995 conference in Beijing was the Fourth World Conference on Women sponsored by the United Nations. The first global conference on women was held in Mexico City in 1975, 2nd in 1980 in Copenhagen, the third conference was held in Nairobi in 1985, and the fourth in Beijing in 1995. The conference having a series of five year reviews. The 1995 Fourth World Conference on Women in Beijing formulated a declaration and a Platform for Action.

She is one of the organizers for Take Back the Night in South Africa. Which will be held on November 24, 2017 globally, its fifth year.

Awards
Cape Towns Woman of the Year
Femina Woman of the year
SAA Women of the Year
The UN Human Rights Activists Award
New York Women Watch Award

External links
Mothers pass baton of struggle - 2016
Women urged to overcome patriarchy, abuse
16 DAYS OF ACTIVISM FOR NO VIOLENCE AGAINST WOMEN AND CHILDREN
Ilitha Labantu - Trousers Handover to School Children

References

Education activists
South African anti-poverty advocates
Community activists
Living people
South African anti-racism activists
South African women activists
Anti-apartheid activists
South African human rights activists
Violence against women in South Africa
University of the Western Cape alumni
Year of birth missing (living people)
Women civil rights activists